Chujaroen Dabransarakarm (ชูเจริญ ดาบรันสารคาม, born 23 January 1994) is a Thai Muay Thai fighter. He is a former Lumpinee Stadium 135 lbs champion.

Muay Thai career
He won the Lumpini Stadium 135 lbs title with a decision win against Yodpanomrung Jitmuangnon. The two of them fought in a rematch a month later, with Dabransarakarm once against winning a decision.

Dabransarakarm participated in the Top King 21 World Series, being scheduled to fight Ilya Grad. Dabransarakarm  the fight by decision.

Churjaroen fought Thananchai Rachanon in the Lumpini Stadium in November 2018, and won a decision.

He entered the Top King 27 154 lbs tournament. Chujaroen won a decision against Victor Santos in the semi finals, and a decision against Magnus Andersson in the finals.

In February 2019, Chujaroen won a decision against the former Lumpini Stadium 147 lbs champion Rafi Bohic.

Dabransarakarm fought Sangmanee Sor Tienpo in May 2019, a lost the fight by a unanimous decision.

Chujaroen fought Tawanchai PK Saenchaimuaythaigym in September 2019 in the Lumpinee Stadium, and lost a decision.

In August 2020, Chujaroen fought a rematch with Thananchai Rachanon in the Rangsit Stadium. Rachanon won a unanimous decision.

Titles and accomplishments

 2018 Top King World Series 154lbs Champion
 
 2017 BBTV CH7 140lbs Champion
 
 2015 Lumpinee Stadium 135lbs Champion
 2014 Fooktien Cup 130lbs Champion

Fight record

|-  style="background:#;"
| 2023-01-28||  ||align=left| Tapaokaew Singmawynn ||Suek Muay Mahakuson Samakom Chao Paktai  || Bangkok, Thailand || || ||  
|-  style="background:#cfc"
| 2022-12-28 || Win||align=left| Rangkhao Wor.Sangprapai || Muay Thai Rakya Soosakon + SAT Super Fight Withee Tin Thai + Petchyindee  || Bangkok, Thailand || Decision || 5 ||3:00
|-  style="background:#cfc;"
| 2022-09-21 || Win ||align=left| Rungkit Wor.Sanprapai ||Sinbi Muay Thai Birthday show + 789Tiger, Bangla Stadium || Phuket, Thailand ||Decision || 5 ||3:00
|-  style="background:#cfc;"
| 2022-06-30 || Win ||align=left| Petpanomrung Kiatmuu9 ||Petchyindee, Rajadamnern Stadium || Bangkok, Thailand ||Decision || 5 ||3:00
|-  style="background:#fbb;"
| 2022-05-12 || Loss ||align=left| Nuenglanlek Jitmuangnon ||Petchyindee, Rajadamnern Stadium || Bangkok, Thailand || Decision || 5 ||3:00
|-  style="background:#cfc;"
| 2022-02-10|| Win ||align=left| Petpanomrung Kiatmuu9 || Petchyindee, Rajadamnern Stadium || Bangkok, Thailand || Decision || 5 ||3:00 
|- style="background:#cfc;"
| 2021-12-02 || Win ||align=left| Chamuaktong Fightermuaythai || Petchyindee, Rangsit Stadium || Bangkok, Thailand || Decision || 5 || 3:00
|-  style="background:#fbb;"
| 2021-10-15|| Loss ||align=left| Petpanomrung Kiatmuu9 || True4U Muaymanwansuk || Buriram province, Thailand || Decision || 5 || 3:00
|-  style="background:#cfc;"
| 2021-04-09|| Win ||align=left| Petpanomrung Kiatmuu9 || Petchyindee Road Show, Temporary Stage || Songkhla, Thailand || Decision || 5 || 3:00
|-  style="background:#c5d2ea;"
| 2020-12-04|| Draw ||align=left| Rungkit Wor.Sanprapai ||Muaymanwansuk, Rangsit Stadium || Rangsit, Thailand || Decision || 5 || 3:00
|-  style="background:#cfc;"
| 2020-10-09||Win||align=left|  Nuenglanlek Jitmuangnon || Muaymanwansuk, Rangsit Stadium || Rangsit, Thailand ||Decision||  5|| 3:00
|- style="background:#cfc;"
| 2020-08-28 || Win ||align=left| Thananchai Rachanon || Muaymanwansuk, Rangsit Stadium || Rangsit, Thailand || Decision || 5 || 3:00
|-  style="background:#fbb;"
| 2020-02-09||Loss ||align=left|  Nuenglanlek Jitmuangnon ||Srithammaracha + Kiatpetch Super Fight || Nakhon Si Thammarat, Thailand ||Decision || 5 || 3:00
|- style="background:#fbb;"
| 2020-01-18|| Loss ||align=left| Meng Guodong || | Wu Lin Feng 2020: WLF World Championship in Baise || Baise, China || Decision (Unanimous) || 3 || 3:00
|- style="background:#cfc;"
| 2019-12-06 ||Win ||align=left| Rafi Bohic || Lumpinee Stadium || Bangkok, Thailand || Decision || 5 || 3:00
|- style="background:#cfc;"
| 2019-09-29|| Win ||align=left| Li Xin || Wu Lin Feng 2019: WLF -67kg World Cup 2019-2020 4th Group Stage  || Zhengzhou, China ||Ext.R Decision || 4 || 3:00
|-  style="background:#fbb;"
| 2019-09-06|| Loss||align=left| Tawanchai PK Saenchaimuaythaigym || Lumpinee Stadium || Bangkok, Thailand || Decision || 5 || 3:00
|- style="background:#fbb;"
| 2019-06-29|| Loss ||align=left| Feng Lei || Wu Lin Feng 2019: WLF -67kg World Cup 2019-2020 1st Group Stage || Zhengzhou, China || Decision (Unanimous)|| 3 || 3:00
|- style="background:#fbb;"
| 2019-05-10|| Loss ||align=left| Sangmanee Sor Tienpo || Lumpinee Stadium || Bangkok, Thailand || Decision || 5 || 3:00
|- style="background:#cfc;"
| 2019-03-30|| Win ||align=left| Liu Yaning || Wu Lin Feng 2019: WLF x Lumpinee - China vs Thailand || Zhengzhou, China || Decision (Unanimous) || 3 || 3:00
|- style="background:#cfc;"
| 2019-02-05 || Win ||align=left| Rafi Bohic || Lumpinee Stadium || Bangkok, Thailand || Decision || 5 || 3:00
|- style="background:#cfc;"
| 2018-12-31 || Win ||align=left| Magnus Andersson || Top King 27 World Series, Final || Pattaya, Thailand || Decision || 3 || 3:00
|-
! style=background:white colspan=9 |
|- style="background:#cfc;"
| 2018-12-31 || Win ||align=left| Victor Santos || Top King 27 World Series, Semi Final || Pattaya, Thailand || Decision || 3 || 3:00
|- style="background:#cfc;"
| 2018-11-27 || Win ||align=left| Thananchai Rachanon || Lumpinee Stadium || Bangkok, Thailand || Decision || 5 || 3:00
|- style="background:#cfc;"
| 2018-09-29 || Win ||align=left| Keivan Soleimani || Top King 22 World Series || Koh Samui, Thailand || Decision || 3 || 3:00
|- style="background:#cfc;"
| 2018-08-12 || Win ||align=left| Littewada Sitthikul || Lumpinee Stadium || Bangkok, Thailand || Decision || 5 || 3:00
|- style="background:#fbb;"
| 2018-07-10 || Loss ||align=left| Thananchai Rachanon || Lumpinee Stadium || Bangkok, Thailand || Decision || 5 || 3:00
|- style="background:#cfc;"
| 2018-06-16 || Win ||align=left| Ilya Grad || Top King 21 World Series || Surat Thani, Thailand || Decision || 3 || 3:00
|- style="background:#cfc;"
| 2018-04-28 || Win ||align=left| Cedric Do || Top King 19 World Series || Thailand || Decision || 3 || 3:00
|- style="background:#cfc;"
| 2018-02-16 || Win ||align=left| Littewada Sitthikul || Muaythai Kiatphet Superfight || Thailand || Decision || 5 || 3:00
|- style="background:#cfc;"
| 2017-12-10 || Win ||align=left| Rambo Petphokhao || Channel 7 Stadium || Bangkok, Thailand || Decision || 5 || 3:00
|-
! style=background:white colspan=9 |
|- style="background:#cfc;"
| 2017-09-30 || Win ||align=left| Meng Guodong || Top King 16 World Series || China || TKO ||  ||
|- style="background:#fbb;"
| 2017-09-05|| Loss ||align=left| Phetmorakot Petchyindee Academy || Lumpinee Stadium || Bangkok, Thailand || Decision || 5 || 3:00
|- style="background:#cfc;"
| 2017-07-17 || Win ||align=left| Littewada Sitthikul || Lumpinee Stadium || Thailand || Decision || 5 || 3:00
|- style="background:#cfc;"
| 2017-05-27 || Win ||align=left| Dmitry Varats || Top King 13 World Series || China || Decision || 3 || 3:00
|- style="background:#cfc;"
| 2017-05-05 || Win ||align=left| Littewada Sitthikul || Lumpinee Stadium || Thailand || Decision || 5 || 3:00
|- style="background:#cfc;"
| 2017-03-21 || Win ||align=left| Chamuaktong Fightermuaythai || Lumpinee Stadium || Bangkok, Thailand || Decision || 5 || 3:00
|- style="background:#cfc;"
| 2017-02-12 || Win ||align=left| Yodpanomrung Jitmuangnon || Channel 7 Stadium || Bangkok, Thailand || Decision  || 5 || 3:00
|-
! style=background:white colspan=9 |
|- style="background:#cfc;"
| 2017-01-14 || Win ||align=left| Marco Novak || Top King 12 World Series || China || Decision || 3 || 3:00
|-  style="background:#fbb;"
| 2016-12-09 || Loss ||align=left| Chamuaktong Fightermuaythai || Lumpinee Stadium || Bangkok, Thailand || Decision || 5 || 3:00
|-
! style=background:white colspan=9 |
|- style="background:#cfc;"
| 2016-10-29 || Win ||align=left| Rafi Bohic || Best Of Siam IX Lumpinee Stadium || Thailand || TKO || 3 ||
|- style="background:#fbb;"
| 2016-10-04 || Loss ||align=left| Littewada Sitthikul || Lumpinee Stadium || Thailand || Decision || 5 || 3:00
|- style="background:#fbb;"
| 2016-09-02 || Loss ||align=left| Chamuaktong Fightermuaythai || Lumpinee Stadium || Bangkok, Thailand || Decision || 5 || 3:00
|- style="background:#fbb;"
| 2016-08-08 || Loss ||align=left| Rambo Petphokhao || Rajadamnern Stadium || Bangkok, Thailand || Decision || 5 || 3:00
|- style="background:#cfc;"
| 2016-07-03 || Win ||align=left| Satanfah Rachanon || Rajadamnern Stadium || Bangkok, Thailand || Decision || 5 || 3:00
|- style="background:#fbb;"
| 2016-06-26 || Loss ||align=left| Sittisak Petpayathai || Lumpinee Stadium || Bangkok, Thailand || Decision || 5 || 3:00
|- style="background:#fbb;"
| 2016-06-03 || Loss ||align=left| Sittisak Petpayathai || Lumpinee Stadium || Bangkok, Thailand || Decision || 5 || 3:00
|- style="background:#cfc;"
| 2016-05-05 || Win ||align=left| Kiatpet Suanahanpeakmai || Rajadamnern Stadium || Bangkok, Thailand || Decision || 5 || 3:00
|- style="background:#fbb;"
| 2016-03-07 || Loss ||align=left| Sittisak Petpayathai || Sermthai Complex || Maha Sarakham Province Thailand || Decision || 5 || 3:00
|-
! style=background:white colspan=9 |
|- style="background:#fbb;"
| 2016-02-12 || Loss ||align=left| Satanfah Rachanon || Lumpinee Stadium || Bangkok, Thailand || Decision || 5 || 3:00
|- style="background:#fbb;"
| 2015-12-22 || Loss ||align=left| Yodpanomrung Jitmuangnon || Lumpinee Stadium || Bangkok, Thailand || Decision  || 5 || 3:00
|- style="background:#fbb;"
| 2015-11-10 || Loss ||align=left| Phetmorakot Petchyindee Academy || Lumpinee Stadium || Bangkok, Thailand || Decision || 5 || 3:00
|- style="background:#cfc;"
| 2015-10-05 || Win ||align=left| Yodpanomrung Jitmuangnon || Rajadamnern Stadium || Bangkok, Thailand || Decision  || 5 || 3:00
|- style="background:#cfc;"
| 2015-09-04 || Win ||align=left| Yodpanomrung Jitmuangnon || Lumpinee Stadium || Bangkok, Thailand || Decision  || 5 || 3:00
|-
! style=background:white colspan=9 |
|- style="background:#fbb;"
| 2015-08-07|| Loss ||align=left| Phetmorakot Petchyindee Academy || Lumpinee Stadium || Bangkok, Thailand || Decision || 5 || 3:00
|- style="background:#cfc;"
| 2015-06-30 || Win ||align=left| Kongsak Saenchaimuaythaigym || Lumpinee Stadium || Bangkok, Thailand || Decision || 5 || 3:00
|- style="background:#fbb;"
| 2015-05-31 || Loss ||align=left| Sittisak Petpayathai || Channel 7 Stadium || Bangkok, Thailand || Decision || 5 || 3:00
|- style="background:#fbb;"
| 2015-04-10 || Loss ||align=left| Yodpanomrung Jitmuangnon || Lumpinee Stadium || Bangkok, Thailand || Decision  || 5 || 3:00
|- style="background:#cfc;"
| 2015-01-25 || Win ||align=left| Padsaenlek Rachanon || Channel 7 Stadium || Bangkok, Thailand || Decision  || 5 || 3:00
|- style="background:#cfc;"
| 2014-11-24 || Win ||align=left| Saksuriya Chor Kow Haa Isuzu || Rajadamnern Stadium || Bangkok, Thailand || Decision  || 5 || 3:00
|- style="background:#fbb;"
| 2014-09-21 || Loss ||align=left| Wanchalerm Sor.Jor.Vichitpadriew || Channel 7 Stadium || Bangkok, Thailand || Decision  || 5 || 3:00
|- style="background:#cfc;"
| 2014-05-12 || Win ||align=left| Monkao Chor Janmanee || Lumpinee Stadium || Bangkok, Thailand || Decision  || 5 || 3:00
|- style="background:#cfc;"
| 2014-01-18 || Win ||align=left| Hannatee Kiatjarernchai || Siam Omnoi Stadium || Bangkok, Thailand || Decision  || 5 || 3:00
|-  style="background:#fbb;"
| 2013-09-07 || Loss||align=left| Por.Tor.Thor. Petchrungruang || Lumpinee Stadium || Bangkok, Thailand || Decision || 5 || 3:00
|- style="background:#cfc;"
|  || Win ||align=left| Wanek Sor Supap ||  || Thailand || ||  ||
|- style="background:#cfc;"
|  || Win ||align=left| Sangthongnoi Tanasuranakhon ||  || Thailand || ||  ||
|- style="background:#fbb;"
| 2011-11-22 || Loss ||align=left| Phetthaweesak W.Rungniran || Rajadamnern Stadium || Bangkok, Thailand || KO ||  || 
|-
| colspan=9 | Legend:

See also
 List of male kickboxers

References

1994 births
Chujaroen Dabransarakarm
Living people
Bantamweight kickboxers
Chujaroen Dabransarakarm